La Tulipe de Haarlem (ru: Гарлемский тюльпан) is a fantastic ballet in three acts and four scenes, with choreography by Lev Ivanov and music by Baron Boris Fitinhoff-Schell, first presented by the Imperial Ballet on  at the Imperial Mariinsky Theatre in St. Petersburg, Russia, with Emma Bessone (as Emma), Pavel Gerdt (as Peters), and Alfred Bekefy (as Andreas).

Revivals 

Revival by Alexander Shiryaev for the Imperial Ballet. Principal Dancers - Vera Trefilova (as Emma), Nikolai Legat (as Peters), and Gyorgy Kiaksht (as Andreas). With Tamara Karsavina, Elena Poliakova, and Mikhail Obukhov in the Pas de trois.

References

Ballets by Lev Ivanov
Ballets by Baron Boris Fitinhof-Schell
1887 ballet premieres